Denise Johnson Montell is an American biologist who is the Duggan Professor of Molecular, Cellular, and Developmental Biology at the University of California, Santa Barbara. Her research considers the oogenesis process in Drosophila and border cell migration. She has served as president of the Genetics Society of America and was elected to the National Academy of Sciences in 2021.

Early life and education 
Montell grew up in a family of scientists and became interested in science at a young age. She was an undergraduate student at the University of California, San Diego, where she majored in biochemistry and cell biology. She moved to Stanford University for her graduate studies, where she investigated substrate adhesion molecules in Drosophila embryogenesis. Montell was a postdoctoral fellow with Allan C. Spradling at the Carnegie Institution for Science, where she developed a new model to study cell motility in vivo by combining cell biology and molecular genetics. She worked on a P element-mediated mutagenesis screening in Drosophila. She was appointed to the faculty at the Carnegie Institution for Science.

Research and career 
Montell joined the faculty at Johns Hopkins University in 1992. After ten years at Johns Hopkins, she was promoted to full Professor, where she became Founding Director of the Center for Cell Dynamics. In 2013, she moved to the University of California, Santa Barbara, where she was made Duggan Professor. In 2020, Montell was appointed president of the Genetics Society of America.

Montell's research considers the oogenesis process in Drosophila and border cell migration. She has studied apoptosis, cell motility, and cell engulfment. Montell identified that cells that had previously been considered to be beyond the point of no return in the dying process can recover and proliferate. The process, which Montell named anastasis, can salvage cells that are difficult to replace. Cell motility is the process by which embryos develop, wounds heal and immune systems fight disease. At the same time, cell motility can give rise to tumor metastasis. Montell created an in vivo model for the study of cell motility.

Awards and honors 
 2014 Elected to the Council of the American Society for Cell Biology
 2014 National Institutes of Health Director's Pioneer Award
 2017 Elected Fellow of the American Association for the Advancement of Science
 2019 Elected Fellow of the American Society for Cell Biology
 2021 Elected to the National Academy of Sciences

Selected publications

Personal life 
Montell is married with two children. Her husband is Craig Montell, a neuroscientist and Distinguished Professor in the Department of the Molecular, Cellular and Developmental Biology at the University of California, Santa Barbara. Her daughter Amanda Montell is an author of popular nonfiction books on linguistics. She has collaborated with her son Brandon Montell, a computer software engineer. He designed and patented the “I’m feeling lucky” feature on Google Earth.

References 

Living people
Stanford University alumni
University of California, San Diego alumni
University of California, Santa Barbara faculty
American biologists
Fellows of the American Association for the Advancement of Science
Members of the United States National Academy of Sciences
Fellows of the American Society for Cell Biology
Year of birth missing (living people)